Bolingbroke may refer to:

People 
 Henry IV of England (1367–1413), also known as Henry of Bolingbroke
 Henry St John, 1st Viscount Bolingbroke (1678–1751), Tory party Jacobite grandee and British statesman
 Other Lords Bolingbroke, bearing the titles:
 Earl of Bolingbroke
 Viscount Bolingbroke
 Lucy of Bolingbroke (died ), Anglo-Norman heiress in central England, later in life countess of Chester
 Roger Bolingbroke (died 1441), English cleric, astronomer, astrologer, magister and alleged necromancer
 Andrew de Bolingbroke, Member of Parliament for the constituency of York, 1299 to 1304

Places

Canada 
 Bolingbroke, Nova Scotia, fictional birthplace of Anne Shirley of the Anne of Green Gables series of books by L. M. Montgomery
 Bolingbroke, Ontario, a community in Lanark County, Ontario, Canada

England 
 Bolingbroke, Lincolnshire, Old Bolingbroke
 Bolingbroke Castle, Old Bolingbroke
 New Bolingbroke, Lincolnshire, a different village

United States 
 Bolingbroke, Georgia, an unincorporated community
 Bolingbroke Mansion, a party house in Radnor, Pennsylvania
 Bolingbroke Penitentiary, a fictional prison in Grand Theft Auto V

Other uses 
 Bristol Bolingbroke, a maritime patrol aircraft and trainer used by the Royal Canadian Air Force during World War II